The 31st Annual Nickelodeon Kids' Choice Awards was held on March 24, 2018, at The Forum in Inglewood, California live on Nickelodeon and either live or on tape delay across all of Nickelodeon's international networks. This was the third time the award ceremony was held at The Forum as the 2015 and 2016 Kids' Choice Awards were also previously held there. John Cena returned as host of the ceremony for the second consecutive year. The show also gave an honor to the people protesting in the March for Our Lives movement that occurred on the same day, including other honors coming from award winners such as Millie Bobby Brown, Camila Cabello, Liza Koshy, and Zendaya.

A new episode of Henry Danger led into the ceremony, while a new episode of Knight Squad served as the lead-out.

Hosts
John Cena
Daniella Monet (orange carpet)

Performers

Presenters

Winners and nominees
Nominations were announced on February 26, 2018. Unlike past years where the voting periods for all categories opened all at once, one genre opened up to voting per week, along with several show-only category voting windows. For the movie categories, voting was opened on February 26, with voting on music categories opened on March 5, television voting beginning on March 12, and a variety of miscellaneous categories on March 19. Winners are listed first and in boldface.

Movies

Television

Music

Miscellaneous

International nominations
The following are nominations for awards from Nickelodeon's international networks, which had the categories and awards presented during continuity during their individual airings of the main American ceremony.

Slimed celebrities
Liza Koshy
Mel B
Heidi Klum
JoJo Siwa
Ashley Banjo
Laurie Hernandez
Barbie (animated segment)
Shawn Mendes
John Cena

References

External links 
  (archived)
 

Kids' Choice
Kids' Choice Awards
Kids' Choice Awards
Nick
2010s in Los Angeles County, California
March 2018 events in the United States
Nickelodeon Kids' Choice Awards
Television shows directed by Glenn Weiss